Kyle Armani Austin (born Oct 18, 1988) is an American professional basketball player currently playing for Club Nacional de Basketball  of the Uruguayan Basketball League.  He played collegiately at USC and then transferred to UC Riverside.

Early life and high school 
Austin was born to parents Carol Austin and Greg Ware in Pasadena, California. Austin attended Pasadena high school where he went on to be San Gabriel valley player of the year in consecutive seasons. He led his team to the CIF division 2 championship game where they lost in the final to Compton Dominguez. Austin received state player of the year honors becoming one of only two players to do so on the losing team.

College career 
Austin signed to University of Southern California where he was given a scholarship made available due to the tragic death of then USC point guard Ryan Francis.

UC Riverside 
Austin then played for UC Riverside.

Professional career 
 2019–present: Uruguay Uruguayan Basketball League – Club Nacional de Basketball
 2016–2019: Argentine Liga Nacional de Básquet – Hispano Americano de Rio Gallegos
 2015–16: Italy A2 – Casalpusterlengo
 2014–15: Italy A2 – Latina Basket
 2013–14: Italy A2 – Bawer Matera
 2013:  Mexico CIBACOPA – Mineros de Cananea
 2012–13: Hungary DivA – Kormend
 2012: Hungary DivA –  Jaszberenyi
 2011: Sweden Basketligan – Boras
 2011: Évreux – France
 2011: Belgium – Pepinsteer
 2010–11: Portual LPB – Vitoria
 2010: Spain LEB Gold – Palencia

Awards and honors 
 Eurobasket Honorable Mention All Italian League 2014
 Eurobasket Hungary Forward of the year 2013
 First Team All Big West 2010
 First Team All Big West 2009

References 

1988 births
Living people
American men's basketball players
UC Riverside Highlanders men's basketball players
Basketball players from Pasadena, California